Pirappancode is a village in Thiruvananthapuram district, Kerala.

Notable people
Amal Pirappancode, writer and artist
Pirappancode Murali, writer and politician

References

External links
 About Pirappancode

Villages in Thiruvananthapuram district